The 1907 Sewanee Tigers football team represented Sewanee: The University of the South during the 1907 Southern Intercollegiate Athletic Association football season.  The team competed in the Southern Intercollegiate Athletic Association (SIAA) and was coached by Arthur G. Erwin in his first year as head coach, compiling a record of 8–1 (6–1 SIAA) and outscoring opponents 250 to 29. Vanderbilt coach Dan McGugin in Spalding's Football Guide's summation of the season in the SIAA wrote "The standing. First, Vanderbilt; second, Sewanee, a might good second;" and that Aubrey Lanier "came near winning the Vanderbilt game by his brilliant dashes after receiving punts."

Sewanee lost the effective SIAA championship game to Vanderbilt on a double pass play then thrown near the end zone by Bob Blake to Stein Stone. Honus Craig then ran in the winning touchdown. It was just the second year of the legal forward pass. The trick play was cited by Grantland Rice as the greatest thrill he ever witnessed in his years of watching sports. Innis Brown later wrote "Sewanee in all probability had the best team in the South."

Schedule

Players

Line

Backfield

Subs

See also
1907 College Football All-Southern Team

References

Sewanee
Sewanee Tigers football seasons
Sewanee Tigers football